John Hampton ( – December 12, 2014)  was an American Grammy Award  winning music engineer and music producer.

Grammy Awards

Other notable credits

References

External links
Interview with John Hampton - NAMM Oral History Library (2005)

1950s births
2014 deaths
American audio engineers
American record producers
Grammy Award winners
Place of birth missing